Wing Commander Academy is a spin-off of Wing Commander II: Vengeance of the Kilrathi, published in 1993.

Reception
Computer Gaming World in 1993 stated of Wing Commander Academy that "if you enjoy space combat simulations, you must have this game. Period". The magazine approved of the "absolute ball to play" game's improved graphics, and the mission builder, and concluded that "Academy is a tremendously exciting game, one which provides many, many hours of play and replay". The 1994 survey gave the game three stars out of five, stating that it was "for those who don't need a plot".

Reviews
PC Games (Germany) - Sep, 1993
PC Player (Germany) - Oct, 1993
ASM (Aktueller Software Markt) - Nov, 1993
Computer Gaming World - May, 1994
Computer Gaming World - Nov, 1993

References

External links
Wing Commander Academy at MobyGames
Review in Compute!

1993 video games
DOS games
Games commercially released with DOSBox
Video game level editors
Video games developed in the United States
Video game spin-offs
Windows games
Wing Commander (franchise)